The Bane Chronicles is a series of connected novellas featuring the character of Magnus Bane from Cassandra Clare's The Mortal Instruments series. The novellas are co-written by Clare, Maureen Johnson, and Sarah Rees Brennan. Release of the novellas began in April 2013 in e-book and audio versions, and were released in a combined print edition in November 2014. The Bane Chronicles has appeared on the New York Times Bestsellers list for Children's Books a number of times beginning in July 2013.

Development
Clare, Johnson, and Brennan have stated that development on the series began when they were telling stories about Clare's character of Magnus Bane to each other. They decided that the non-traditional style of interconnected novellas would be best served by initial Internet publication. The series is also notable for using well-known actors as narrators for the audiobook versions of each novella. The authors provided a list of dream narrators to their publisher, and each audiobook has a different narrator, including Andrew Scott, Michael Trevino, and Jesse Williams. For some of the actors, this was their first time doing voice work.

The first 10 stories were released between April 2013 and March 2014, and the compiled print version, released in November 2014, contained an eleventh story exclusive to the book.

Novellas
 What Really Happened in Peru (with Sarah Rees Brennan)
 Release Date: April 16, 2013
 Narrator: Jesse Williams
 The Runaway Queen (with Maureen Johnson)
 Release Date: May 21, 2013
 Narrator: George Blagden
 Vampires, Scones and Edmund Herondale (with Sarah Rees Brennan)
 Release Date: June 18, 2013
 Narrator: Andrew Scott
 The Midnight Heir (with Sarah Rees Brennan)
 Release Date: July 16, 2013
 Narrator: David Oyelowo
 The Rise of the Hotel Dumort (with Maureen Johnson)
 Release Date: August 20, 2013
 Narrator: Stephen Lunsford
 Saving Raphael Santiago (with Sarah Rees Brennan)
 Release Date: September 17, 2013
 Narrator: Michael Trevino
 Fall of the Hotel Dumort (with Maureen Johnson)
 Release Date: October 15, 2013
 Narrator: Cecil Baldwin (of Welcome to Night Vale)
 What To Buy The Shadowhunter Who Has Everything (And Who You're Not Officially Dating Anyway)
 Release Date: November 19, 2013
 Narrator Jordan Gavaris
 The Last Stand of the New York Institute (with Maureen Johnson and Sarah Rees Brennan)
 Release Date: December 17, 2013
 Narrator: Jamie Bamber
 The Course of True Love (and First Dates)
 Release Date: March 18, 2014
 Narrator: Gareth David-Lloyd
 The Voicemail of Magnus Bane
 Release Date: November 11, 2014 (exclusively in full book print version)
 Narrators: Seth Numrich and Molly C. Quinn (exclusively in full book audio version)

References

American young adult novels
2010s fantasy novels